Big Six Mile Creek Marina is a  state park and marina located on the upper Niagara River on Grand Island in Erie County, New York.

The Marina is in the path of totality for the 2024 solar eclipse, with 3 minutes and 38 seconds of totality.

Park description
Big Six Mile Creek Marina is located in a protected valley along a tributary to the Niagara River, and features the only public boat launch facilities on the western side of Grand Island.

The park offers a marina with 134 seasonal boat slips, as well as a boat launch ramp and fishing access. The park is open from May through November.

The park's facilities and docks, initially constructed in the 1950s, were improved and reconstructed in 2013.

See also
 List of New York state parks

References

External links
 New York State Parks: Big Six Mile Creek Marina

State parks of New York (state)
Parks in Erie County, New York
Marine parks of New York (state)
Protected areas established in the 1950s
1950s establishments in New York (state)